The Dunedin Blue Jays are a Minor League Baseball team of the Florida State League and are the Single-A affiliate of the Toronto Blue Jays Major League Baseball club. They are located in Dunedin, Florida, and play their home games at TD Ballpark, which opened in 1990 and seats 8,500 people.

Two teams named the Blue Jays, both affiliates of Toronto, have played in Dunedin: the original incarnation, from 1978 to 1979, and the current team, established in 1987. Since their inception they have won five division championships, in 1999, 2000, 2003, 2006, and 2017. In 2017 they were named co-champions of the FSL.

History
The original incarnation of the Dunedin Blue Jays was founded in 1978. They were established as the Class A affiliate of the new Toronto Blue Jays franchise. They played for two seasons in the Florida State League and were one of four Class A teams in Toronto's farm system. After the 1979 season the team was disbanded as Toronto expanded its farm system into higher classifications.

Local interests were unable to sign a deal with other major league teams to keep minor league baseball in Dunedin; however Toronto continued to hold its spring training in the city. In 1987, Toronto decided to establish a new Florida State League franchise in Dunedin. They originally played at Grant Field until 1990, when Dunedin Stadium was completed.

When Major League Baseball owners considered locking out the regular players and using "scabs" instead for the 1995 season, Dunedin would have been used as the Toronto Blue Jays' home field due to Ontario laws concerning replacement workers. The MLB labor dispute was resolved before the plan was implemented, however.

In 2006, the Blue Jays made it to the Florida State League Championship Series, losing to the St. Lucie Mets 3 games to 0.

In 2007, the Dunedin Blue Jays were nominated for the 2007 Corporate Support Award, which is awarded annually by the Florida Recreation & Park Association, to an organization that goes above and beyond to support and fund recreational programming.

On September 6, 2017, Dunedin won their first Florida State League championship by defeating the Tampa Yankees two games to one. Dunedin shared the FSL championship with the Palm Beach Cardinals, as the impending threat from Hurricane Irma forced the cancellation of the championship series.

For the 2019 season, the team played at Jack Russell Memorial Stadium while TD Ballpark underwent renovations.

As a result of the COVID-19 pandemic, the 2020 Minor League Baseball season was initially postponed before being cancelled on June 30 of that year. Due to the pandemic causing restrictions on travel between the United States and Canada, there were plans of the Toronto Blue Jays relocating to Dunedin for the 2020 MLB season. Ultimately the team decided to play the majority of their home games at the stadium of their Triple-A affiliate in Buffalo, New York.

In December 2020, as part of the reorganization of Minor League Baseball, the Dunedin Blue Jays were chosen to remain an affiliate of the Toronto Blue Jays. However along with the other remaining teams of the Florida State League, the team changed classes from Advanced-A to Low-A and were placed in a league called the Low-A Southeast. In 2022, the Low-A Southeast became known as the Florida State League, the name historically used by the regional circuit prior to the 2021 reorganization, and was reclassified as a Single-A circuit.

Season-by-season
These statistics are current through the 2022 season.

Full season (1978–1979, 1987)

Split season (1988–present)

 The championship series was canceled due to the impending threat from Hurricane Irma.
 The playoffs were canceled due to the impending threat from Hurricane Dorian.

All-time records

Roster

Players
Dunedin Blue Jays players who have made it to Toronto:

Jeremy Accardo
Russ Adams
J. P. Arencibia
Derek Bell
Pat Borders
Dave Bush
Rob Butler
Chris Carpenter, 3-time All-Star
Brett Cecil, All-Star 2013
Gustavo Chacín
Carlos Delgado, 2-time All-Star
Kelvim Escobar
Shawn Green, 2-time All-Star
Gabe Gross
Vladimir Guerrero Jr., 2-time All-Star
Juan Guzmán All-Star 1992
Roy Halladay, 8-time All-Star, Hall of Fame inductee
Pat Hentgen, 3-time All-Star
Aaron Hill All-Star 2009
Orlando Hudson
Casey Janssen
Reed Johnson
Jeff Kent, 5-time All-Star
Billy Koch
Brandon League All-Star 2011
Adam Lind
Jesse Litsch
Shaun Marcum
Dustin McGowan
Lloyd Moseby All-star 1986
Josh Phelps
Kevin Pillar
David Purcey
Alex Ríos, 2-time All-Star
Ricky Romero All Star 2011
Travis Snider
Ed Sprague Jr. All-Star 1999
Shannon Stewart
Dave Stieb, 7-time All-Star
Mike Timlin
Dave Weathers
Vernon Wells, 3-time All-Star

References

External links
 

Baseball teams established in 1985
Florida State League teams
Sports in Pinellas County, Florida
Toronto Blue Jays minor league affiliates
Professional baseball teams in Florida
1985 establishments in Florida
Dunedin, Florida